Cavan Thomas Biggio (born April 11, 1995) is an American professional baseball utility player for the Toronto Blue Jays of Major League Baseball (MLB). He is the son of former MLB player and Hall of Famer Craig Biggio.

High school and college

Biggio attended St. Thomas High School in Houston, Texas. He lettered four times in both baseball and football. The Philadelphia Phillies selected Biggio in the 29th round of the 2013 Major League Baseball draft. He did not sign and chose to attend the University of Notre Dame. In three seasons of college baseball with the Notre Dame Fighting Irish, Biggio batted .272 with 15 home runs, 70 runs batted in (RBIs), and 33 stolen bases. In 2014 and 2015, he played collegiate summer baseball with the Harwich Mariners of the Cape Cod Baseball League, and was named a league all-star in 2015.

Professional career
Considered a top prospect heading into the 2016 Major League Baseball draft, Biggio was selected in the fifth round by the Toronto Blue Jays. Biggio signed with the Blue Jays for the full draft slot bonus of $300,000 on June 17, and was assigned to the Vancouver Canadians of the Class A-Short Season Northwest League. On July 26, Biggio was named an All-Star for Vancouver. He finished the 2016 season with the Lansing Lugnuts of the Class A Midwest League. In 62 games, Biggio batted .273 with 26 RBIs and 11 stolen bases. He also exhibited above-average plate discipline, walking 33 times while striking out 35 times. He played the entire 2017 season with the Dunedin Blue Jays of the Class A-Advanced Florida State League. Playing alongside top Blue Jays prospects Vladimir Guerrero Jr. and Bo Bichette, Biggio batted .233 with 11 home runs, 60 RBIs, and 11 stolen bases.

The Blue Jays assigned Biggio to the New Hampshire Fisher Cats of the Double-A Eastern League to begin the 2018 season. On September 1, Biggio was named the Eastern League's Rookie of the Year and Most Valuable Player. Biggio began the 2019 season with the Buffalo Bisons of the Triple-A International League. Through his first 42 games with the Bisons, he hit .307 with six home runs.

On May 24, 2019, Biggio was called up to the Toronto Blue Jays. He made his major league debut that night versus the San Diego Padres. Two days later, on May 26, he got his first major league hit. In his next at bat that game, he hit his first home run. On September 17, Biggio hit for the cycle against the Baltimore Orioles at Oriole Park at Camden Yards, becoming the third player in Blue Jays history to accomplish the feat, following Jeff Frye in 2001 and Kelly Gruber in 1989. Biggio had four RBIs, scored three runs, and stole two bases in the game. Cavan, alongside his father, Craig (who hit for the cycle for the Houston Astros on April 8, 2002), joined Gary Ward and his son Daryle as only the second father and son duo to hit for the cycle in MLB history. On the season, Biggio hit .234 in 100 games.

Overall with the 2020 Blue Jays, Biggio batted .250 with eight home runs and 28 RBIs in 59 games. In 2021, he batted .224/.322/.356 with 7 home runs and 27 RBIs in 79 games.

On March 22, 2022, Biggio signed a $2.123 million contract with the Blue Jays, avoiding salary arbitration.

On January 13, 2023, Biggio signed a one-year, $2.8 million contract with the Blue Jays, avoiding salary arbitration.

Personal life
Biggio is the son of Patricia and former MLB second baseman Craig Biggio, an inductee of the National Baseball Hall of Fame. His given name comes from County Cavan in Ireland. He has a brother, Conor, and a sister, Quinn. Conor also played baseball for St. Thomas and Notre Dame, and was a 34th round draft selection by the Houston Astros in the 2015 MLB draft. Conor later went to work for the Office of the Commissioner of Baseball. As of the 2020–21 collegiate season, Quinn plays softball for Notre Dame.

Upon reaching the major leagues, Biggio and Vladimir Guerrero Jr., who had been called up a month earlier, became the first teammates in MLB history to be sons of Hall of Fame players.

See also
List of second-generation Major League Baseball players

References

External links

Notre Dame Fighting Irish bio

1995 births
Living people
American expatriate baseball players in Canada
American people of Italian descent
Baseball players from Houston
Buffalo Bisons (minor league) players
Dunedin Blue Jays players
Harwich Mariners players
Lansing Lugnuts players
Major League Baseball second basemen
New Hampshire Fisher Cats players
Notre Dame Fighting Irish baseball players
Surprise Saguaros players
Toronto Blue Jays players
Vancouver Canadians players
St. Thomas High School (Houston, Texas) alumni